The Imperial School of Jurisprudence (Russian: Императорское училище правоведения) was, along with the Page Corps, a school for boys in Saint Petersburg, the capital of the Russian Empire.

The school for would-be imperial administrators was founded by Duke Peter of Oldenburg in 1835. The classes were accommodated in six buildings along the Fontanka Quay. The premises were renovated in 1893–95 and 1909–10, when the main building acquired its cupola. After the October Revolution of 1917, the school was disbanded, but its memory survives in the nursery rhyme about Chizhik-Pyzhik.

Among the instructors were lawyers of Imperial Russia, such as Anatoly Koni and Włodzimierz Spasowicz. Boys studied in the school for six or seven years. The graduates of the School of Jurisprudence include Ivan Aksakov, Aleksey Apukhtin, Konstantin Pobedonostsev, Alexander Serov, Vladimir Stasov, Vladimir Dmitrievich Nabokov, Pyotr Ilyich Tchaikovsky and his younger brother Modest Ilyich Tchaikovsky.

Sources 
Соболевский В. И. Императорское училище правоведения в 1885–1910 годах. St. Petersburg, 1910.

External links 
 
 History and illustrations on the website of the Saint Petersburg Law Institute

19th century in Saint Petersburg
Schools in Saint Petersburg
1835 establishments in the Russian Empire
1917 disestablishments in Russia
Law schools in Russia
Defunct schools in Russia
Educational institutions established in 1835
Educational institutions disestablished in 1917
Cultural heritage monuments of federal significance in Saint Petersburg